"Graham Taylor: An Impossible Job" is a 1994 British fly-on-the-wall documentary directed and produced by Ken McGill, written by Patrick Collins, and made by Chrysalis for Cutting Edge. The documentary follows the England football team through the 18 months before their failure to qualify for the 1994 FIFA World Cup Finals and showed the pressure manager Graham Taylor was under before his resignation. It was originally broadcast by Channel 4 on 24 January 1994.

Background
Neil Duncanson (who joined Chrysalis as a freelance producer in 1991) suggested the documentary, though some of his colleagues believed they would never get permission. The title of the film, An Impossible Job, reflects the difficulties of the England manager's position.

Film-maker Ken McGill and his team recorded Graham Taylor and his team throughout the qualifiers. Taylor agreed to take part in the programme as he hoped it would show the differences between club and international management. But as results turned for the worse, the focus shifted to Taylor and the documentary captured a manager increasingly bereft as results went against him. In 2013, journalist Rob Shepherd revealed, "None of us in the 'Hack Pack' who followed England at the time knew that a documentary was being filmed. But Graham Taylor did."

Taylor thought about cancelling filming before the trip to Norway in June 1993, but believed that the written press - who were already hostile towards him - would seize on it as an admission England would not qualify.

Before England's match against the Netherlands, the Dutch FA had denied access to the crew filming Taylor, but the England manager helped to smuggle them inside the De Kuip stadium. The crew donned England tracksuits and carried their film equipment into the stadium in team kitbags.

Synopsis

The documentary follows Graham Taylor before, during and after England's crucial qualifier against the Netherlands in Rotterdam.

England's campaign started poorly with a home draw against Norway in October 1992. Taylor's subsequent touchline performances included the quotes "Do I not like that" and "Can we not knock it?" from an away game against Poland in May 1993. During the following game, with England 2-0 down in Norway in June and making several misplaced passes, Taylor can be heard off-screen saying "fucking hell".

Taylor visits David Platt in Italy to ensure the player consents to his captaincy being handed to Stuart Pearce. He holds court in front of an audience of prison inmates of Ashwell Prison. He quips and scolds journalist Rob Shepherd during a press conference: Shepherd looks dejected by Taylor's team selection for the game against the Netherlands and pleads with him to change his mind. Taylor mocks him for his negativity, "Rob, I can't continue... Rob, I can't have... Listen, Rob... I cannot have faces like yours around about me. [Uproarious laughter] No I can't – I tell you this now, if you were one of my players with a face like that, I'd fucking kick you out. You'd never have a chance. Put a smile on your face, we're here for business, come on."

In October 1993, during the penultimate match in the Netherlands, referee Karl-Josef Assenmacher did not send off Ronald Koeman for fouling Platt. After Koeman scored, Taylor vents his frustration on the fourth official Markus Merk and the nearside linesman. After repeatedly complaining about the decisions, he says to Merk: "You see, at the end of the day, I get the sack." He then says to the linesman, "I'm just saying to your colleague, the referee has got me the sack. Thank him ever so much for that, won't you?"

Appearances

Graham Taylor (England manager)
Phil Neal (England assistant manager)
Lawrie McMenemy (England assistant coach)
Fred Street (England physiotherapist)
Charles Hughes (The Football Association Director of Coaching)
Rob Shepherd (Today journalist)
David Platt
Paul Gascoigne
Carlton Palmer
Ian Wright
Paul Ince
Nigel Clough
Les Ferdinand
Paul Merson

Broadcast and release
The film was broadcast by Channel 4 on 24 January 1994 as part of the Cutting Edge documentary series. A censored version of the film was broadcast a few days later. More than six million people tuned in to watch the film.

A 77-minute version of the film including previously unseen footage was released on VHS on 7 July 1997 retitled Graham Taylor: "Do I Not Like That. The Final Chapter". North One (which now owns Chrysalis) sold the documentary to ITV who broadcast the extended version of the documentary on 5 October 2008 on ITV4.

Aftermath
During the qualifying campaign, commentators felt that Taylor and his two assistants Phil Neal and Lawrie McMenemy gave the impression of never being in control of their situation. Neal was criticised for being a 'yes man' after the documentary was broadcast.

The 2001 comedy feature film Mike Bassett: England Manager was inspired partly by Graham Taylor and An Impossible Job.

In 2013, Ken McGill told BBC Sport, "I found it hard to take the consequences of the film. But there is nothing I would change. It is a piece of honest film-making."

Reception
The Daily Express called it "A fascinating mix of black comedy and personal tragedy."

101 Great Goals said in 2008, "...the documentary is a super watch... Above all, it explains much about the pressure of being the England manager. It does also make you wonder how Graham Taylor is now a respected pundit."

The Guardian reported in 2010, "An Impossible Job was immediately hailed as a comic masterpiece". Daniel Taylor of The Guardian in 2013 described it as "a piece of television gold." David Elkin of Pulp Football in the same year said, "The documentary is a brilliant examination of the media, the pressure and the utterly ludicrous nature of being the England national team manager." He added: An Impossible Job gives a real insight into the doomed campaign and the nature of the role."

Barney Ronay in his 2010 book The Manager: The absurd ascent of the most important man in football said, [Taylor] "turned out to be a brilliantly absorbing subject for a tragicomic documentary film." Andy Mitten in his 2003 book The Rough Guide to Cult Football said, "the programme's enduring legacy is to present him [Taylor] unfairly as a provincial buffoon."

Awards

See also
1994 FIFA World Cup qualification (UEFA)
England national football team manager
List of sports films

References

External links

An Impossible Job on tvduck.com
Retro YouTube: Graham Taylor and England's calamitous World Cup 1994 qualifying campaign. The Daily Telegraph. 8 October 2013

1994 films
1994 British television episodes
1994 documentary films
British television documentaries
Channel 4 documentaries
Cutting Edge (TV series) episodes
Documentary films about association football
Films shot in London
Films shot in Poland
Films shot in Norway
Films shot in Italy
Films shot in the Netherlands
Films set in London
Films set in Poland
Films set in Norway
Films set in Italy
Films set in the Netherlands
1994 directorial debut films
England national football team
1990s English-language films
British sports documentary films
1990s British films